Live Tour 2011: Dejavu (stylized as LIVE TOUR 2011 ~Dejavu~) is tenth live DVD by Japanese singer-songwriter Koda Kumi. It charted at No. 1 on the Oricon DVD chart and charted for a total of 11 weeks, selling over 35,624 copies.

Track listing
Official Track list

DVD1
Opening Movie
 Pop Diva
 Black Candy
 Lollipop 
 Okay
 Aitakute
 At the WeekendINTERLUDE MOVIE 1
 Anata dake ga
 Ai wo Tomenaide
 Love is Over / Ienai yo / Swallowtail Butterfly ~Ai no Uta~ / Ai no Uta
 Passing By
 0-ji Mae no Tsunderella (misono cover)
 Suki de, Suki de, Suki de.
 walkINTERLUDE MOVIE 2
 Bambi
 I Don't Love You!??
 Hey Baby!
 Melting
 Choi Tashi LifeINTERLUDE MOVIE 3
 Encore:
 Be My Baby
 Megumi no Hito
 Dance Part
 Cutie Honey / Butterfly
 Poppin' Love Cocktail feat. Teeda
 You Are Not Alone
 Chiisa Koi no Uta
 Comes Up
 Lick me♥

DVD2
 Making ofVideo & DocumentsFuji-Q HighlandMaiko in Narikiri, KyotoComplete Ranks!Private Fashion Collection
 Live Bonus VideosPop DivaBlack CandyAt the Weekend

References

2012 video albums
Koda Kumi video albums
Live video albums